The United States competed at the 2017 World Games in Wroclaw, Poland, from 20 to 30 July 2017. The U.S. received 22 medals in 19 different events.

Medalists
The following competitors won medals at the Games for the United States:

Competitors

Air sports

Glider

Parachute

American football

During the 2015 split between IFAF Paris and IFAF New York, in which IFAF Paris expelled USA Football in 2017. USA Football was replaced by the United States Federation of American Football in Paris, while New York retained USA Football as their active member. Since IFAF New York was recognized by the International Olympic Committee at the time, the United States Federation of American Football was permitted to organize the United States national American football team for the 2017 World Games.

Players, mainly professional Americans playing in Europe, were chosen for the team on May 31, 2017. Players were promised full funding from the United States Federation of American Football, however, the funding was withdrawn just days before the competition and players had to provide their own transportation to Wroclaw. As a result, most of the team withdrew from the competition and were instead replaced by volunteers who were already in Europe at the time. Most of the team arrived the day before their opening match vs the Germany national American football team. The Americans lost to Germany 13–14, in which was the first loss ever for a United States national American football team in international competition.

Summary

Semifinal

Bronze medal game

Archery

Compound

Recurve/Barebow

Gymnastics

Trampoline
Paige Howard won a gold medal in Double Mini Women.

Indoor rowing

Karate

Thomas Scott competed in the men's kumite 75 kg event and Sakura Kokumai competed in the women's kata event.

Lacrosse
The U.S. won gold in women's lacrosse, beating Canada 11-8 in the final. 2017 was the first year that the World Games included any version of lacrosse.

Muay Thai

Powerlifting

Men

Women

Sport climbing

Speed

Lead

Flying disc
The U.S. defeated Colombia 13-7 in the final of Ultimate Mixed Flying Disc to earn the gold medal.

Water skiing

Tricks

Slalom

Jump

Wakeboard

References

External links
Full results of the United States

Nations at the 2017 World Games
2017